Silver Springs is an unincorporated community and census-designated place (CDP) in Marion County of northern Florida. It is the site of Silver Springs, a group of artesian springs and a historic tourist attraction that is now part of Silver Springs State Park. The community is part of the Ocala metropolitan area. It was first listed as a CDP for the 2020 census, at which time it had a population of 2,844. 

One of Florida's first tourist attractions, the springs drew visitors even before the U.S. Civil War. Glass-bottom boats have been a popular way to see the  complex. A small amusement park with various animals, a concert stage, a carousel, and exhibits also developed.

History

Silver Springs was founded in 1852.

Since the mid-19th century, the natural environment of Silver Springs has attracted visitors from throughout the United States.  The glass-bottom boat was invented and tours of the springs began in the late 1870s. In the 1920s, W. Carl Ray and W.M. "Shorty" Davidson, after leasing the land from Ed Carmichael (upon whose death the springs were left to the University of Florida), developed the land around the headwaters of the Silver River into an attraction that eventually became known as Silver Springs Nature Theme Park.  The attraction featured native animal exhibits, amusement rides, and 30 or 90-minute glass-bottom boat tours of the springs.  The 1934 'Princess Donna' is the oldest and only remaining operational boat from this bygone era.  The "Princess Donna' currently operates on the Rainbow River in Dunnellon, Florida. In 2013, the State of Florida took over operations of Silver Springs and combined it with the adjacent Silver River State Park to form the new Silver Springs State Park.  The T. W. Randall House on the National Register of Historic Places is located to the northeast.

Several defunct tourist attractions were once located near Silver Springs.  The Western-themed Six Gun Territory theme park, which included several attractions such as the Southern Railway & Six Gun  narrow gauge railroad, operated from 1963 to 1984.  The Wild Waters water park also existed in Silver Springs and operated from 1978 to 2016.

Silver Springs was "whites only" until 1967. From 1949 to 1969, African Americans were served by nearby Paradise Park, Florida, which closed when Silver Springs integrated racially.

Cattle ranch development
Canadian billionaire Frank Stronach has been building the Adena Springs Ranch for cattle, an abattoir, residential property development, and a thoroughbred horse farm in the area, stirring concern over plans for water use and how groundwater draw will affect the springs.

Geography
Silver Springs is in central Marion County and is bordered to the southwest by the city of Ocala, the county seat.

Transportation
The main road through Silver Springs is State Road 40 which runs east and west from Rainbow Lakes Estates to Ormond Beach in Volusia County. State Road 326 terminates at SR 40, as does State Road 35, which becomes County Road 35 north of SR 40 before terminating at SR 326. County Roads 314 and 314A are also important north-south county roads that run west and into the Ocala National Forest.

Notable people
Ross Allen, herpetologist

Bruce Mozert, photographer
Ted Potter Jr., PGA Tour professional golfer

See also
 Paradise Park, Florida

Gallery

References

External links

Silver Springs State Park
Through the Looking Glass of Silver Springs

Census-designated places in Florida
Census-designated places in Marion County, Florida
Unincorporated communities in Marion County, Florida
Unincorporated communities in Florida
1852 establishments in Florida